Aquinas usually refers to Thomas Aquinas (1225-1274), philosopher and theologian.

Aquinas may also refer to:

Educational institutions
Aquinas Academy (disambiguation), several institutions with the name
Aquinas College (disambiguation), several colleges with the name
Aquinas High School (disambiguation), several schools with the name
Aquinas Diocesan Grammar School in Belfast, Northern Ireland
St. Thomas Aquinas College, a private four-year liberal arts college in Sparkill, New York, United States
St. Thomas Aquinas High School (disambiguation)
Aquinas Institute – a Roman Catholic co-educational secondary school in Rochester, New York, United States
Aquinas Institute of Theology - a Dominican seminary and graduate school of theology in St. Louis, Missouri, United States

See also
 Thomas Aquinas Higgins (1932-2018), United States federal judge
 Saint Thomas Aquinas (book), by G. K. Chesterton
 MV St. Thomas Aquinas, Philippines ferry that sank in 2013
 St. Thomas Aquinas Church (disambiguation), list of churches with the name